North Direction Island is 25 km north-east of Cape Flattery in the Great Barrier Reef Marine Park Authority and about 15 km south of Lizard Island. It is around 51 hectares or 0.51 square km in size.

References

Islands on the Great Barrier Reef